Bussa is a surname. Notable people with the name include:

 Gael Bussa (born 1993), Congolese lawyer and politician
 Nansel Bussa (born 2003), Nigerian footballer 
 Rubellia Bassa (born between 33-38AD), Roman and daughter of Gaius Rubellius Blandus

See also
 Busa (surname)
 Busse
 Bussa (disambiguation)